Udsali may refer to several places in Estonia:
Udsali, Rõuge Parish, village in Võru County, Estonia
Udsali, Võru Parish, village in Võru County, Estonia